Virtual reality (VR) is a simulated experience that can be similar to or completely different from the real world.

Virtual Reality may also refer to:
Virtual Reality (gamebooks), a series of six gamebooks released in 1993 and 1994
"Virtual Reality" (song), 1997 song by Alexia
Virtual Reality (Total Escapism), 1992 album by Oliver Lake